HD 132406 is a star in the northern constellation of Boötes. With an apparent visual magnitude of  8.45, it is invisible to the naked eye. The distance to this star is 231 light years based on parallax, but it is drifting closer with a radial velocity of −37.8 km/s. The star has an absolute magnitude of 4.30. It has one confirmed exoplanet companion.

The stellar classification of HD 132406 is G0V, matching an ordinary G-type main-sequence star like the Sun. It is an older star with an age of up to nine billion years and is spinning with a leisurely projected rotational velocity of 1.7 km/s. It appears to have a similar mass as the Sun but is about 36% greater in girth. The metallicity, or chemical abundance of heavier elements, appears slightly higher than in the Sun. The star is radiating 1.8 times the luminosity of the Sun from its photosphere at an effective temperature of 5,754 K.

A planetary companion was announced in 2007, based on the radial velocity variation of the host star as measured using the ELODIE spectrograph instrument. An astrometric measurement of the planet's inclination and true mass was published in 2022 as part of Gaia DR3.

References

External links
 HIC 73146
 Image HD 132406

G-type main-sequence stars
Planetary systems with one confirmed planet
Boötes
Durchmusterung objects
132406
073146